Kona is an unincorporated community and coal town in Letcher County, Kentucky, United States. The Kona Post Office closed in 1996.

References

Unincorporated communities in Letcher County, Kentucky
Unincorporated communities in Kentucky
Coal towns in Kentucky